Hydrolyzed protein is a solution derived from the hydrolysis of a protein into its component amino acids and peptides. While many means of achieving this exist, most common is prolonged heating with hydrochloric acid, sometimes with an enzyme such as pancreatic protease to simulate the naturally occurring hydrolytic process.

Uses
Protein hydrolysis is a useful route to the isolation of individual amino acids. Examples include cystine from hydrolysis of hair, tryptophane from casein, histidine from red blood cells, and arginine from gelatin.

Common hydrolyzed products used in food are hydrolyzed vegetable protein and yeast extract, which are used as flavor enhancers because the hydrolysis of the protein produces free glutamic acid. Some hydrolyzed beef protein powders are used for specialized diets.

Protein hydrolysis can be used to modify the allergenic properties of infant formula. Reducing the size of cow milk proteins in the formula makes it more suitable for consumption by babies suffering from milk protein intolerance. The US FDA has approved a label for this usage of partially-hydrolyzed proteins in 2017, but a meta-analysis published the same year shows insufficient evidence for this use.

Hydrolyzed protein is also used in certain specially formulated hypoallergenic pet foods, notably dog foods for dogs and puppies that suffer from allergies caused by certain protein types in standard commercial dog food brands. The protein contents of the foods are split into peptides which reduces the likelihood for an animal's immune system recognizing an allergic threat. Hydrolyzed protein diets for cats are often recommended for felines with food allergies and certain types of digestive issues.

See also 
 Acceptable daily intake
Acid-hydrolyzed vegetable protein
 E number
 Food allergy
 Food intolerance
 Food labeling regulations
 Glutamic acid
 Monosodium glutamate
 Protein allergy

References

Food additives
Protein structure
Umami enhancers